Torá (Toraz) is an extinct Chapacuran language that was once spoken along the lower stretches of the Marmelos River in Brazil. SIL reported 40 speakers in 1990, but declared it extinct in the 2000s.

References

Chapacuran languages

Languages of Brazil